The 1997 Australian Touring Car Championship was a CAMS sanctioned Australian motor racing title open to 5.0 Litre Touring Cars complying with Group 3A regulations. The championship, which was the 38th Australian Touring Car Championship, began on 15 March at Calder Park Raceway and ended on 3 August at Oran Park Raceway after 10 rounds.

Promoted as the Shell Australian Touring Car Championship, the series was won by Glenn Seton driving a Ford EL Falcon.

Teams and drivers

The following teams and drivers competed in the 1997 Australian Touring Car Championship.

Race calendar
The championship was contested over ten rounds with three races per round.

Race winners

Points system
Championship points were awarded on a 30–26–24–22–20–18–16–14–12–10–8–6–4–2–1 basis to the top 15 finishers in each race.

Championship results

Privateers' Cup
The Privateers' Cup was open to Category 2 and Category 3 entries only. Points were awarded on a 30–26–24–22–20–18–16–14–12–10–8–6–4–2–1 basis to the top 15 eligible finishers in each race.

Note: Only the top five positions are shown.

See also
1997 Australian Touring Car season

References

External links
  Australian Titles, www.cams.com.au 
 Official V8 Supercar site
 Natsoft Race Results

Australian Touring Car Championship seasons
Australian Touring Car Championship